A One Day International (ODI) is an international cricket match between two representative teams, each having ODI status, as determined by the International Cricket Council (ICC). An ODI differs from Test matches in that the number of overs per team is limited, and that each team has only one innings. Nepal earned One Day International (ODI) in 2018 as a result of their performances at the 2018 Cricket World Cup Qualifier. Nepal played their first ODI against the Netherlands national cricket team on 1 August 2018.

The list is arranged in the order in which each player won his first ODI cap. Where more than one player won his first ODI cap in the same match, those players are listed alphabetically by surname.

Key

Players
Statistics are correct as of 16 March 2023.''

See also 
List of Nepal Twenty20 International cricketers

References

 
ODI cricketers
Nepal ODI